Koya is a village in the Rural District in Western Area of Sierra Leone and lies about 27 miles from Freetown.

External links
http://www.zuzu.org/sier.html

Sierra Leone Liberated African villages